Isorhamnetin is an O-methylated flavon-ol from the class of flavonoids. A common food source of this 3'-methoxylated derivative of quercetin and its glucoside conjugates are pungent yellow or red onions, in which it is a minor pigment, quercetin-3,4'-diglucoside and quercetin-4'-glucoside and the aglycone quercetin being the major pigments. Pears, olive oil, wine and tomato sauce are rich in isorhamnetin. Others sources include the spice, herbal medicinal and psychoactive Mexican tarragon (Tagetes lucida), which is described as accumulating isorhamnetin and its 7-O-glucoside derivate. Nopal (Opuntia ficus-indica (L.)) is also a good source of isorhamnetin, which can be extracted by supercritical fluid extraction assisted by enzymes.

Metabolism
The enzyme quercetin 3-O-methyltransferase uses S-adenosyl methionine and quercetin to produce S-adenosylhomocysteine and isorhamnetin.

The enzyme 3-methylquercetin 7-O-methyltransferase uses S-adenosyl methionine and 5,7,3',4'-tetrahydroxy-3-methoxyflavone (isorhamnetin) to produce S-adenosylhomocysteine and 5,3',4'-trihydroxy-3,7-dimethoxyflavone (rhamnazin).

Glycosides 
 Isorhamnetin-3-O-rutinoside-7-O-glucoside
 Isorhamnetin-3-O-rutinoside-4'-O-glucoside
 Narcissin (Isorhamnetin-3-O-rutinoside)

See also 
 List of antioxidants in food
 List of phytochemicals in food
 Tamarixetin, the 4'-methyl analog

References

External links 
 Isorhamnetin on chemblink.com

O-methylated flavonols
Resorcinols